Margaret Stewart, Countess of Angus and Mar (died 1417) was Countess of Angus and Lady of Abernethy in her own right. Her father was Thomas Stewart, 2nd Earl of Angus.

She was married to Thomas, Earl of Mar with whom she had no children. After her husband's death in 1374, she began an extramarital affair with William Douglas, 1st Earl of Douglas, who was married to the Earl of Mar's sister. With the Earl of Douglas, she had two children, George Douglas, 1st Earl of Angus (c. 1380–1403) and Lady Margaret Douglas who in 1404 received the lands of Bonjedward from her half-sister, Lady Isabel Douglas. The countess secured a charter of her estates for her son, to whom, in 1389 the title was granted by King Robert II.

See also
Earl of Angus

References

Notes

Sources
Balfour Paul, Sir James, Scots Peerage IX vols, Edinburgh 1904. 
Fraser, Sir William, The Douglas Book IV vols. Edinburgh 1885. 
The Records of the Parliaments of Scotland to 1707 , K.M. Brown et al. eds (St Andrews, 2007–2011).

External links
 thepeerage.com page

Margaret
Margaret Stewart
Year of birth unknown
1417 deaths
14th-century Scottish earls
15th-century Scottish people
15th-century Scottish women